Catherine T. Montgomery (April 1, 1867 – September 17, 1957) was a Canadian-born American educator, clubwoman, and hiker based in Bellingham, Washington. She donated money and land to improve Federation Forest State Park, and is known as the "Mother of the Pacific Crest Trail".

Early life 
Montgomery was born in Valleyfield, Prince Edward Island, and raised in Schuyler, Nebraska. Her father was a railroad carpenter; her parents, William Montgomery and Jessie MacPherson Montgomery, were born in Scotland. She described herself as a cousin or niece of author Lucy Maud Montgomery. She graduated from the University of Washington.

Career 
In 1899, Montgomery joined the faculty of New Whatcom Normal School, a precursor institution to Western Washington University. She chaired the Bellingham Lecture Course, a public program of speakers and performers. She supported women's suffrage, prohibition, and labor reform laws. Although she decried the bureaucracy of state-run education, she ran for state superintendent of schools in 1920. She retired from teaching in 1926. She was president of the Progressive, Literary, and Fraternal Club (PLF) of Bellingham from 1922 to 1923. She ran for county superintendent of schools in 1930. In 1931 she proposed parent education classes in Bellingham. She was active in the Washington State Federation of Women's Clubs.

Montgomery was an avid traveler and hiker. In 1905 she traveled with writer Ella Rhoads Higginson around Alaska by train for almost two months. She felt the 1908 Messina earthquake while studying in Rome. In January 1926, Montgomery met mountaineer and textbook salesman Joseph Hazard, and described her hope for a hike in the West to match the Appalachian Trail through fourteen eastern states. That evening, he shared the idea at a meeting of the Mount Baker Club in Bellingham. While Clinton C. Clarke is called "the Father of the Pacific Crest Trail", his involvement in the project came several years later.

Personal life and legacy 
Montgomery lived with fellow educator Ida Agnes Baker; they were both among the founding members of the PLF. "Memories of financial struggle, of trans-continental trips, of farming together, come to me as I recall the locking of Ida Baker’s life with mine, but above all comes the memory of tramping together", she wrote in a eulogy for her partner, who died when she was struck by a street car in 1921. 

Montgomery died in 1957, aged 90 years, in Bellingham. She left much of her estate to the Washington State Federation of Women's Clubs to enlarge and improve Federation Forest State Park, where the Catherine Montgomery Nature Interpretive Center hosts educational programs about the forest. In 2010, she was induced into the Northwest Women's Hall of Fame, as "the Mother of the Pacific Crest Trail".

Montgomery's former home in Bellingham became housing for the Sisters of Newark serving at St. Joseph's Hospital.

References

External links 

 Federation Forest State Park, Washington State Parks Foundation

1867 births
1957 deaths
People from Kings County, Prince Edward Island
People from Bellingham, Washington
American women educators
Western Washington University faculty
Clubwomen
Hikers
Educators from Bellingham, Washington